Lac de Montcineyre is a lake in Compains, Puy-de-Dôme, France. At an elevation of 1182 m, its surface area is 0.4 km².

External links

Montcineyre